Valérie Lévêque-Nadaud (born 16 March 1968 in Soyaux, Charente) is a retired female race walker from France.

Achievements

References

sports-reference

1968 births
Living people
French female racewalkers
Athletes (track and field) at the 1996 Summer Olympics
Olympic athletes of France
Sportspeople from Charente